Henry Ashworth (4 September 1794 – 17 May 1880) was an English cotton manufacturer, friend of Richard Cobden, and founding member of the Anti-Corn Law League.

Early life and business career
Henry Ashworth was born on 4 September 1794 into a prominent Quaker farming family at Birtenshaw, then an outlying hamlet to the north of Bolton, Lancashire. His father was John Ashworth, who supplemented his income by buying cotton and selling it to local cottage weavers, buying back the finished cloth to sell in Manchester and who in 1793 had built the water powered New Eagley cotton spinning mill on the banks of the Eagley brook.

He was sent to Ackworth School run by the Society of Friends and in 1808 became involved at the New Eagley mill, taking over its management in 1818. He was joined by his younger brother Edmund in 1821.
The partnership of the two brothers expanded both the mill and the business and by 1831 they had 260 employees. In 1832 they bought the partially completed Egerton Mill which had been built upstream at Egerton.

Benevolent employers, they established schools, a library and a reading room. Ashworth was a staunch nonconformist, and refused to pay church rates. He supported the schemes of Edwin Chadwick to implement the Poor Law of 1834; but was a tough opponent of trades unions. In a dispute with Edmund, the business was split in 1854, with Henry taking the New Eagley Mill and Edmund the Egerton Mill. By this time sons of both brothers had taken over much of the management responsibility. In 1880 Henry Ashworth retired, handing over New Eagley to his eldest son, George Binns Ashworth.

Anti-Corn Law activity
He was a founder of the Anti-Corn Law League, and was one of its major supporters. He had met Richard Cobden in 1837, and became a firm friend.

In 1840 he was one of a deputation that waited upon Lord Melbourne to urge the repeal of the corn laws. 'You know,' said the premier, 'that to be impracticable.' Sir Robert Peel was equally unhelpful. In answer to  Ashworth's plea that the import of food should not be restricted in order to maintain rents. Sir James Graham called out, 'Why, you are a leveller!' and asked whether he was to infer that the labouring classes had some claim to the landlords' estates. Ashworth protested; in dismissing the deputation Sir James told them that if the corn laws were repealed great disasters would fall upon the country, the land would go out of cultivation, church and state could not be upheld, the national institutions would be reduced to their elements, and the houses of the leaguers would be pulled about their ears by the people they were trying to excite.

In 1843, in company with John Bright and Cobden, he visited County Durham, Northumberland, Cumberland, and East Lothian, to survey agriculture—they were sometimes mentioned as the ABC of the League. At the large meeting held in Manchester 23 December 1845, Ashworth proposed that £250,000 should be raised for the purpose of the agitation. The corn laws were repealed, and the final meeting of the League was held in the Manchester Town Hall on 2 July 1846. Ashworth defended Cobden at the meeting held in Manchester after the incident in the House of Commons, when Peel charged the leader of the League with connivance at assassination. He also assisted Cobden in the negotiation of the Cobden–Chevalier Treaty.

Later life
During a long life he was an advocate of peace, retrenchment, and reform; and enjoyed shooting. He made several continental tours, and in February 1880 left his house, The Oaks, Turton, to winter in Italy, as he had usually done for some years. Whilst travelling from Rome he caught a chill, and at Florence was laid up with Roman fever. After about two weeks' illness, he died at Florence, 17 May 1880 and is buried in the Protestant cemetery there.

Family
Henry married Letitia Binns of Liverpool and with her had 11 children, 6 sons and 5 daughters. Of his sons George Binns, John and Henry were involved in the New Eagley business; two others died in childhood.

Works
His major work is Recollections of Richard Cobden and the Anti-Corn Law League (two editions, London 1876 and 1881), written with John Watts. He also wrote:

Statistical Illustrations of Lancaster, 1842. 
A Tour in the United States and Canada, 1861. 
 An account of the Preston strike of 1853–1854; and some pamphlets.

See also
 List of mills in Bolton
 Benjamin Hick
 John Hick

References

Attribution

1794 births
1880 deaths
People from Bolton
People educated at Ackworth School
18th-century English people
19th-century English writers
19th-century English male writers